Elaine Estrela Moura (born 1 November 1982), commonly known as Elaine, is a Brazilian footballer and coach. A versatile player that can be used in the defense or midfield, she played for the Brazil women's national football team. She previously played for Tyresö and Umeå IK of the Swedish Damallsvenskan, as well as Saint Louis Athletica in the American Women's Professional Soccer (WPS).

Club career

She started playing soccer influenced by her brother, and played for Bahia teams until 2000, but never getting any salary. Three years later, she became professional in Ferroviária. After a game between the Brazilian national team and Umeå IK in 2004, she was contracted by Umeå and played for them in Damallsvenskan from 2005 to 2009, where she joined Marta.

In 2010, she moved to the United States and played for Saint Louis Athletica in Women's Professional Soccer (WPS). When the club went bust shortly afterwards, she decided to return to Sweden and joined Tyresö FF of the Damallsvenskan.

Tyresö won the Damallsvenskan title for the first time in the 2012 season and Elaine collected her fifth Swedish league winner's medal. With competition for places becoming very strong at Tyresö, Elaine moved on loan to nearby Elitettan club Älta IF in July 2013. Ahead of the 2014 season she made her transfer to Älta permanent.

She stopped playing after the 2014 season and joined Djurgårdens as an assistant coach for 2015. In 2018 she missed playing and joined Division 3 club Lindhagen FF as a player.

International career
Elaine's performances for Ferroviária brought her to the notice of Brazil women's national football team selectors and she featured in the gold medal-winning national team at the 2003 Pan American Games.

She was selected for the 2004 Athens Olympics and played in the 2–1 overtime final defeat by the United States, as Brazil collected silver medals.

She remained in the national selection for the 2007 Pan American Games, where Brazil retained their gold medals. At the 2007 FIFA Women's World Cup in China, Elaine featured in Brazil's striking 4–0 semi-final win over the United States and the 2–0 final defeat by Germany.

She was included in the final 21-player squad for the 2011 FIFA Women's World Cup in Germany. She was removed from the national team squad two days before the start of the London 2012 Olympics when magnetic resonance imaging revealed a muscle injury.

Her last official games for Brazil took place in December 2011 at the Torneio Internacional Cidade de São Paulo.

References

External links

esporte.uol.com.br
pan.uol.com.br

1982 births
Living people
Sportspeople from Salvador, Bahia
Brazilian women's footballers
Footballers at the 2004 Summer Olympics
Olympic footballers of Brazil
Olympic silver medalists for Brazil
Saint Louis Athletica players
Expatriate women's footballers in Sweden
Brazilian expatriate sportspeople in Sweden
Brazilian expatriate sportspeople in the United States
2007 FIFA Women's World Cup players
2011 FIFA Women's World Cup players
Olympic medalists in football
Tyresö FF players
Damallsvenskan players
Umeå IK players
Medalists at the 2004 Summer Olympics
Brazil women's international footballers
Brazilian expatriate women's footballers
Women's association football midfielders
Associação Ferroviária de Esportes (women) players
Pan American Games gold medalists for Brazil
Pan American Games medalists in football
Footballers at the 2003 Pan American Games
Footballers at the 2007 Pan American Games
Medalists at the 2003 Pan American Games
Medalists at the 2007 Pan American Games
Women's Professional Soccer players
Elitettan players